Diede de Groot defeated Kgothatso Montjane in the final, 6–2, 6–2 to win the ladies' singles wheelchair tennis title at the 2021 Wimbledon Championships. It was her third Wimbledon singles title, and the third step in an eventual Super Slam.

Aniek van Koot was the defending champion from when the event was last held in 2019, but was defeated in the quarterfinals by Jordanne Whiley.

Seeds

Draw

Finals

References

Sources
WC Women's Singles

Women's Wheelchair Singles
Wimbledon Championship by year – Wheelchair women's singles